TB 191 was a second-class torpedo boat constructed for the Colony of Tasmania and later operated by the Commonwealth Naval Forces and the Royal Australian Navy. She was sold in 1911.

Design and construction
TB 191 was ordered by the Australian colonial government of Tasmania in 1882 to protect the colony from possible Russian or French attack, and was built by John I. Thornycroft & Company.

Operational history
Built at a cost of £4,011, TB 191 arrived in Tasmania on board SS Abington on 1 May 1884. Operated by the Tasmanian Torpedo Corps, she appears to not have been used much in service of the Tasmanian colony. She was sold in 1905 to the Colony of South Australia, being towed to Adelaide by HMCS Protector, before becoming part of the Commonwealth Naval Forces.

She was sold in 1911.

Notes

References

1883 ships
Ships built in Chiswick
Ships of the South Australian Naval Service
Torpedo boats of the Royal Australian Navy
Torpedo boats of the Tasmanian Torpedo Corps
Ships built by John I. Thornycroft & Company